is a Japanese word meaning "prayer", and is occasionally used as a feminine name in Japanese. It may refer to:

People
Inori Minase (水瀬 いのり, born 1995), Japanese actress, voice actress and singer who played Rem in Re:Zero − Starting Life in Another World

Fictional characters
Inori Aizawa, an anthropomorphic character created to represent Internet Explorer.
Inori Hiiragi, a character from Lucky Star
Inori Yamabuki, a main character from Fresh Pretty Cure!
Inori Yuzuriha, one of the protagonists from the anime Guilty Crown.

Music
 "Inori" (Sakanaction song), 2013
 "Inori" (Hitomi Shimatani song), 2005
 Inori (Stockhausen), a 1974 composition by Karlheinz Stockhausen
 "Inori" (Ayahi Takagaki come across Feldt Grace song), 2009, a song performed by Ayahi Takagaki in the role of Mobile Suit Gundam 00 character Feldt Grace
 "Inori", a 1983 song by The Alfee
 "Inori", a 1999 single by Hitoe Arakaki
 "Inori", a 2007 DVD single by Def Tech featuring Sakura
 "Inori", a 2007 single by Miki Imai
 "Inori", a 2010 digital single by Kis-My-Ft2
 "Inori (Namida no Kidō)", a 2012 song by Mr. Children
 "Inori", a 2003 single by Tetsurō Oda
 Inori, a 2011 triple A-side single by Sekai no Owari
 "Inori", a 1979 single by Tsuyoshi Nagabuchi
 "Inori", a 2017 album by musical group Kanashimi

Japanese feminine given names